The Catholic Media Association, formerly the Catholic Press Association of the United States and Canada, is an association of American and Canadian newspaper and media specialists specialized on reporting on the Catholic Church. Founded in 1911, it has over 600 member organizations and reaches to over 26 million people.

Its stated purpose is to assist its members to serve effectively, through the medium of the printed word and electronic media, the social, intellectual and spiritual needs of the entire human family, and to spread and support the Kingdom of God.

Regions
In 2010, the CMA had four regions: Eastern, Southern, Midwestern, and Western.

See also
Catholicism in Canada
Catholicism in the United States
Catholic Church and politics in the United States
History of Catholicism in the United States

Footnotes

External links
Catholic Press Association official website

Christian mass media in Canada
Religious mass media in the United States
Catholic Church in Canada
Catholic Church in the United States
Organizations established in 1911
American journalism organizations